Jacques Peyrat (born 18 October 1931 in Belfort) is a French politician and lawyer who was mayor of Nice from 1995 to 2008 and has been senator from the Alpes-Maritimes from 1998 to 2008.

Jacques Peyrat came from a military family that settled in Nice in 1946 where he studied law and letters. In 1947 at the age of 16 he joined the Rally of the French People (Rassemblement du Peuple Français, RPF), the political party that General Charles de Gaulle created that year.

In 1953 Peyrat enlisted in the 1st Foreign Parachute Battalion of the French Foreign Legion. It was in French Indochina that he met and became friends with the French politician Jean-Marie Le Pen.

Upon his return to civilian life, Peyrat united his social and professional interests. His presidency of parachute and aeronautical groups won him a silver medal for youth and sports.

In 1962 Peyrat began his political career, at first as a member of the National Centre of Independents and Peasants (CNIP), and then in the breakaway Independent Republicans party of Valéry Giscard d'Estaing, as a Nice municipal councillor. At the same time, he practiced law with a specialty in penal law.

In 1973 Peyrat rejoined the Front National, Jean-Marie Le Pen's far-right party, and was a Front National deputy from 1986 to 1988, general counsel of the Canton of Nice 14 from 1992 to 1998 and regional councillor.

In 1995 Jacques Peyrat left the Front National and was elected Mayor of Nice with the slogan "Divers droite" (figuratively, An Alternative Right). He was reelected in 2001.

In 1996 he rejoined the RPR. Since September 27, 1998 he has been senator first with then RPR, then with the center-right Union for a Popular Movement (Union pour un Mouvement Populaire, UMP) from the Alpes-Maritimes. In 2002, Peyrat founded la Communauté d'agglomération de Nice-Côte d'Azur and became president of it.

He is also a member of the Superior Council of the Military Reserve (Conseil supérieur de la réserve militaire) and a member of the High Court of Justice (Haute Cour de Justice).

Sources

Entry to Jacques Peyrat in the French Wikipedia, translated from the French
City of Nice official biographical sketch

1931 births
Living people
Politicians from Belfort
Rally of the French People politicians
National Centre of Independents and Peasants politicians
Independent Republicans politicians
National Rally (France) politicians
Rally for the Republic politicians
Union for a Popular Movement politicians
French Senators of the Fifth Republic
Mayors of Nice
Soldiers of the French Foreign Legion
French military personnel of the First Indochina War
Members of the Organisation armée secrète
Senators of Alpes-Maritimes
Deputies of the 11th National Assembly of the French Fifth Republic